Al Reeves (18641940) was an American vaudeville and minstrel show entertainer, vocalist, and banjo player.

Catch phrase: "Give me credit, boys."

He began performing in 1878, and was heavily involved in the burlesque scene. He later toured with his own company, Al Reeves' Specialty Co. and produced his famous "Big Beauty Show" ("99% Girls 99%") which bragged packed houses for twenty years. He was later known as the "King of Burlesque."

Reeves made his only known recordings with Columbia Records and Edison Records from 1891 and 1893, and around the same time had an inadvertent influence on the young Al Jolson's interest in show business.

1864 births
Place of birth unknown
1940 deaths
Place of death unknown
American burlesque performers
Vaudeville performers
Vaudeville producers